Captain Thomas Lloyd (details of birth and death unknown) was an English cricketer who played in one first-class cricket match for Berkshire in 1792.

Lloyd played for Berkshire against Marylebone Cricket Club (MCC) at Old Field, Bray from 2 to 4 August 1792.  He made scores of 1 not out and 9 in the match, which Berkshire won by 10 runs.

References

Bibliography

External links
 

English cricketers
English cricketers of 1787 to 1825
Berkshire cricketers
Year of birth unknown
Year of death unknown
Marylebone Cricket Club cricketers